Yeda is a 2013 Indian Marathi-language film directed by Kishor Pandurang Belekar and produced by Satish More.

Cast 
 Reema Lagoo as Sadhna Narvekar
 Satish Phulekar as Vasant Narvekar
 Ashutosh Rana as Appa Kulkarni (Yeda)
 Kishori Shahane as Savitri Kulkarni
 Pradnya Shastri as Pargya Narvekar
 Aniket Vishwasrao as Unmesh Kulkarni

References

External links